Hookbill could refer to
 Hook Bill, a breed of domestic ducks
 the avicultural term for members of the parrot family (typically anything larger than a parakeet) based on the curved shape of the bill, distinguishing them from softbills and other birds such as doves and finches
 Lanaʻi hookbill (Dysmorodrepanis munroi) an extinct Hawaiian finch
 The chestnut-winged hookbill (Ancistrops strigilatus), of western Amazonia

Animal common name disambiguation pages